The Haunting of Hell House is a 1999 American horror film directed by Mitch Marcus and based on "The Ghostly Rental" by Henry James. It was also known as Henry James’ the Ghostly Rental. The film stars Michael York, Andrew Bowen and Jason Cottle.

Plot 
James Farrow (Andrew Bowen) is a young student who discovers his girlfriend is pregnant and in a panic, pressures her and forces her to an illegal abortion. However, James' lover dies during the abortion due to the negligence of the abortionist and he is left in a pit of grief and guilt. He begins seeing demonic, ghostly visions of his deceased girlfriend and begins to visit the house where they had first met. Unable to live in the state any longer, James requests the help and advice of Professor Ambrose, an eerie man whose life has been shattered by multiple tragedies and unfortunate events in his family. Professor Ambrose is also tormented by visions of his deceased daughter in the haunted house where spirits are restless and vengeful.

Cast 
 Michael York  as Professor Ambrose
 Andrew Bowen as James Farrow
 Jason Cottle as Fletcher
 Claudia Christian as Lucy
 Aideen O'Donell as Sarah
 Brian Glanney as Jenkins
 Ciaran Davies as Graham
 Colm O'Maonlai as Reginald
 Mike Finn as Lieutenant Ryan
 Mitch Marcus as Professor Benest

Production
In March 1998 the Merlin Film Fund issued a memo to investors seeking to raise more than E£1 million to make the film, then called The Ghostly Rental. The investment would be supported by loans from National Irish Bank and Ernst & Young would act as tax consultants on behalf of investors. To put in a maximum of IR£25,000 (E31,750) an investor was only required to pay IR£7,600 and the remainder would come from bank loans, which would then be repaid when the movie was produced. An individual could then write off 80% of the IR£25,000 against tax, leaving IR£9,600 repayable by the Irish tax authorities. After the initial investment of IR£7,600 this guaranteed a profit of IR£2,000.

The Department of Arts, Heritage, Gaeltacht and the Islands granted the section 481 certificate for The Ghostly Rental subject to strict guidelines. These included the stipulations that Irish crew would fill 19 senior positions among the 82 staff involved and that the company must produce audited accounts confirming "the direct expenditure on the employment of Irish personnel and on the purchase of Irish goods and services to be some IR£ 1,121,068".

The film was shot in Ireland at Roger Corman's studio in Galway and went straight to video.

Irish tax authorities later sent demands to more than 1,000 investors claiming that Merlin Films Group failed to provide sufficient proof that the funds it raised for the production of various movies in Ireland were spent in concurrence with the regulations governing the tax breaks.

Reception 
Brendan Kelly of Variety wrote that "it's not quite the campy fun it could've been."

References

Further reading

External links 
 
Haunting of Hell House at TCMDB
Complete text of The Ghostly Rental

1999 films
1999 horror films
American haunted house films
Films based on short fiction
Films based on works by Henry James
Films produced by Roger Corman
1990s English-language films
Films directed by Mitch Marcus
1990s American films